Wagait Beach is a locality approximately 8 km west of Darwin, on the opposite side of the harbour. It makes up the Wagait Shire local government area. The population was 461 in 2016. Wagait Beach is not part of Darwin, but many of its residents use the Mandorah ferry to travel to work in Darwin.

Wagait Beach is on the north coast of the Cox Peninsula, which forms the western side of Darwin Harbour. It is part of the Hundred of Bray, as surveyed by George Goyder in 1869–70. "Wagait" (also spelled "Waugite") is a local Aboriginal language word meaning beach or salt water country. It also refers to the people from that country: i.e., salt water people.

History

In 1942, after the Bombing of Darwin, a military base was established at Waugite Point on the north east of the Cox Peninsula, and a huge observation tower was constructed, with a communications bunker underneath it. Waugaite tower was destroyed by Cyclone Tracy in 1974. The precise origin of the name of the community is unclear, but the beach adjacent to Wagait Point is called Wagait Beach. One source claims that the community was named after the tower, which is unconvincing as the tower was named after Waugite (Wagait) Point and so clearly is not the origin of the name. Whether or not the beach was known as Wagait beach before the tower was built is not known.

The Wagait Community is home to many artists, musicians and writers. Wagait Beach hosts several annual cultural events. At Easter is the annual Wagait Beach Bicycle Carnaval & Mardi Gras. In July is the Mandorah Ukulele Folk Festival. In September is the annual Wagait Arts Festival.

Transport
Wagait Beach can be accessed by a 15-minute passenger ferry trip, from Cullen Bay (Darwin), to Mandorah which is 5 km from Wagait Beach. There is a bicycle path from Mandorah to Wagait Beach. It is a 128 km drive from Darwin via the Cox Peninsula Rd through Berry Springs.

Facilities

The Wagait Beach Supermarket, on Wagait Tower Road, is the only shop in the community.

The Cox Country Club, on Cox Drive, is the local social club (open Thursday to Sunday).

Meals are available from the Cox Country Club. Takeaway food is available from the Wagait Beach Supermarket.

The Wagait Shire Council office is on Wagait Tower Road.

A sports and recreation ground, operated by the council, is on Forsyth Road.

Wagait Beach Bush Retreat offers holiday accommodation.

Nearby locations
Belyuen is a mainly Aboriginal community located 14 km to the south, via Cox Peninsula Road.

Charles Point, is the most northerly point of the Cox Peninsula, approximately 15 km to the west. The historic Charles Point Lighthouse is located there, as was a Radio Australia shortwave transmitter station (now closed and dismantled).

Mandorah, 5 km to the south east, was the home of the Mandorah Hotel, which overlooked Darwin Harbour, but was demolished in 2014.

West Point, just north of Mandorah is the west head of Darwin Harbour.

Bynoe Harbour is a natural harbour on the west side of Cox Peninsula, approximately 40 km from Wagait beach by road, via Bynoe Harbour Access Road (turn off Cox Peninsula Road 27 km south of Wagait Beach).

See also
List of surviving Consolidated B-24 Liberators

References

Populated places in the Northern Territory
Beaches of the Northern Territory